The Republic of Poland Ambassador to Finland is the Poland's foremost diplomatic representative in the Republic of Finland, and head of the Poland's diplomatic mission there.

History 
Diplomatic relations between Poland and Finland were established on February 7, 1920. Embassy of Poland is located in Helsinki in Kulosaari suburb. In addition there are Honorary Cosulates of Poland in Espoo, Jyväskylä, Kuopio, Tampere and Turku.

List of ambassadors of Poland to Finland

Second Polish Republic 

 1918-1920: Mikołaj Himmelstjerna (chargé d’affaires)
 1920-1922: Michał Sokolnicki (envoy)
 1922-1927: Tytus Filipowicz (envoy)
 1927-1928: Tomasz Sariusz-Bielski (chargé d’affaires)
 1928-1935: Franciszek Charwat (envoy)
 1936-1941: Henryk Sokolnicki (envoy)
 1941-1942: Józef Weyers (chargé d’affaires)

January 18, 1942 – closure of the embassy due to breaking diplomatic relations

People's Polish Republic 

 1946-1947: Stefan Szumowski (envoy)
 1947-1949: Jan Wasilewski (envoy)
 1949-1950: Włodzimierz Umiastowski (chargé d’affaires)
 1950: Feliks Petruczyński (envoy)
 1950-1954: Kazimierz Krawczyński (chargé d’affaires)
 1954-1957: Jan Lato
 1957-1965: Edward Pietkiewicz
 1965-1972: Aleksander Juszkiewicz
 1972-1978: Adam Willmann
 1978-1982: Włodzimierz Wiśniewski
 1982-1983: Józef Fajkowski
 1983-1984: Jan Załęski
 1985-1990: Henryk Burczyk
 1992-1995: Andrzej Potworowski
 1996-2000: Józef Wiejacz
 2000-2005: Stanisław Stebelski
 2005-2007: Andrzej Szynka
 2007: Stanisław Cios (chargé d’affaires)
 2007-2011: Joanna Hofman
 2011-2015: Janusz Niesyto
 2015-2017: Przemysław Grudziński
 2017: Tomasz Kozłowski (chargé d’affaires)
 2017-2019: Jarosław Suchoples
 2019: Marcin Tatarzyński (chargé d’affaires)
 since 2019: Piotr Rychlik

References 

Finland
Poland